The List of railway stations in Chemnitz covers all current, former or planned stations, halts and loading points in the current area of Chemnitz.

Legend 
The columns used in the table list the information explained below:

 Name: Name of the station according to the infrastructure register of DB Netz, former stations are sorted by their last name. Divergent names of the station operators (e.g. DB Station&Service) are listed small below.
 Type: Type of the station, former types are listed in italics with the year of the change, if known.  –  (railway station),  –  (part of a station),  –  (halt),  –  (industrial siding),  –  (refuge siding),  –  (loading point) (status: 2019)
 Position: Position of the station stating the mileage and the Saxon railway line abbreviation. CA – Chemnitz–Adorf railway, CO – Küchwald–Obergrüna railway, COB – Chemnitz-Altendorf–Chemnitz Beyerstraße railway, DW – Dresden–Werdau railway, DWCh – Chemnitz-Hilbersdorf–Chemnitz Hbf railway, KC – Neukieritzsch–Chemnitz railway, KCCh – Küchwald–Chemnitz-Hilbersdorf railway, LW – Limbach–Wittgensdorf railway, LWd – Limbach–Wüstenbrand railway, NW – Neuoelsnitz–Wüstenbrand railway, RC – Riesa–Chemnitz railway, RCCh – Abzw Chemnitz-Furth–Chemnitz-Hilbersdorf railway, WbC – Wechselburg–Küchwald railway, WbCF – Chemnitz-Glösa–Chemnitz-Furth railway, ZC – Zwönitz–Chemnitz Süd railway
 Code: Abbreviation of the station according to the Deutsche Bahn station codes.
 Platforms: Current or last number of tracks with platforms of the station. Stations without platforms were never intended for passenger traffic.
 Former names: Listing of station's former names and year of renaming; originally planned names below in italics.
 Opening: Date of station opening, possibly with distinction between freight and passenger traffic.
 Closure: Date of station closure, possibly with distinction between freight and passenger traffic.
 Image: Photo of the station.
 Grey highlighted stations are closed or planned.

List

See also 
 List of railway stations in Saxony

External links 
 Railway stations in Saxony on Sachsenschiene.de
 Photo reports about railway lines around Chemnitz on Eisenbahnseite.de

References 

!
Chemnitz